HMS Thrush was a  composite gunboat, the third ship of the name to serve in the Royal Navy.

Design

The Redbreast class were designed by Sir William Henry White, the Royal Navy Director of Naval Construction in 1888.

Construction

Thrush was launched on 22 June 1889 at Greenock.  Her triple-expansion reciprocating steam engine was built by the Greenock Foundry, and developed , sufficient to propel her at  through her single screw.

Career

Her first station was the North America and West Indies Station based at the Royal Naval Dockyard in Bermuda and Halifax, Nova Scotia, where, under the command of Prince George, later to become King George V of the United Kingdom. Thrush arrived at Bermuda with Prince George in command on 18 July 1890, with a torpedo boat in tow, and later proceeded to Halifax. She was also on active service during the Second Boer War, which lasted between October 1899 and June 1902 where she was commanded by Lieutenant Warren Hastings D'Oyly. In early 1902 she helped a British force in Nigeria re-open trade routes on the Lower Niger, closed by piracy of some locals. Lieutenant Hector Lloyd Watts-Jones was appointed in command on 5 July 1902.

From 1906 Thrush worked for HM Coastguard before becoming a cable ship in 1915.  She then became a salvage ship in 1916 before being wrecked off Glenarm in Northern Ireland on 11 April 1917.

In January 1917, Thrush was involved in the dramatic rescue of 46 submariners and shipyard officials, from the sunken . The unusual 'steam-powered', and newly built submarine suffered an uncontrolled descent to the bottom of the Gareloch, on the Firth of Clyde, during sea trials. Thrush was called in from a nearby mooring. Along with Gossamer and Ranger, they were able to partially raise the stricken vessel with cables, just enough to allow rescue of more than half the people on board.

References

Bibliography

External links
 HMS Thrush details at the Royal Fleet Auxiliary Historical Society

 

Redbreast-class gunboats
Ships built on the River Clyde
Victorian-era gunboats of the United Kingdom
Cable ships of the United Kingdom
1889 ships
Shipwrecks of Northern Ireland
Maritime incidents in 1917